Rafael Felipe Barreto, usually called Rafael Carioca (born 17 July 1986 in Rio de Janeiro) is a professional Brazilian football midfielder playing with Juventus (SC).

Career
Rafael Carioca started playing with Joinville in 2005 and stayed until 2008, but, he had stints on loan with Caxias Futebol Clube, Figueirense (2007), Desportiva Ferroviária (2008) and CR Vasco da Gama (2008). He made one appearance for Joinville in the 2006 Campeonato Brasileiro Série C, and one appearance in each, Campeonato Catarinense 2006 and 2007. Earlier, he made 2 appearances for Caxias in the 2004 Campeonato Catarinense.

In January 2009 he was contracted by the Serbian SuperLiga club FK Banat Zrenjanin, where he played until summer 2010. When he came the club was struggling in the 2008–09 Serbian SuperLiga and after the end of the second half of the season the club ended up relegated with Rafael playing 7 matches and scoring once. In the next season, 2009-10 Banat was competing at second national tier, the Serbian First League with Rafael playing further 11 matches.

In January 2011 he was back in Brazil and he signed with América Futebol Clube (RN). In summer 2011 he moved to Mesquita Futebol Clube.

Honour
Figueirense
1 time Copa do Brasil runner-up: 2007

References

External sources 
 
 Rafael Carioca video and presentation at Vermelho de paixão

Living people
1986 births
Footballers from Rio de Janeiro (city)
Brazilian footballers
Brazilian expatriate footballers
Joinville Esporte Clube players
Figueirense FC players
Desportiva Ferroviária players
FK Banat Zrenjanin players
Expatriate footballers in Serbia
Serbian SuperLiga players
América Futebol Clube (RN) players
Association football midfielders
Grêmio Esportivo Juventus players
Al-Wehda Club (Mecca) players
Expatriate footballers in Saudi Arabia